An IP Multimedia Services Identity Module (ISIM) is an application residing on the UICC, an IC card specified in TS 31.101. This module could be on a UMTS 3G or IMS VoLTE network. It contains parameters for identifying and authenticating the user to the IMS. The ISIM application can co-exist with SIM and USIM on the same UICC making it possible to use the same smartcard in both GSM networks and earlier releases of UMTS.

Among the data present on ISIM are an IP Multimedia Private Identity (IMPI), the home operator domain name, one or more IP Multimedia Public Identity (IMPU) and a long-term secret used to authenticate and calculate cipher keys. The first IMPU stored in the ISIM is used in emergency registration requests.

External links
3GPP TS 31.101 UICC-terminal interface; Physical and logical characteristics
3GPP TS 31.103 Characteristics of the IP Multimedia Services Identity Module (ISIM) application - ISIM standard
3GPP TS 24.229 IP multimedia call control protocol based on Session Initiation Protocol (SIP) and Session Description Protocol (SDP); Stage 3

Mobile telecommunications standards
3GPP standards